Sir Colin Tradescant Crowe  (7 September 1913 – 19 July 1989) was a British diplomat who was stationed in Egypt at a critical period, and afterwards was ambassador to Saudi Arabia, high commissioner to Canada and permanent representative at the United Nations.

Early life 
Colin Tradescant Crowe was born in Yokohama, Japan, where his father, Edward Crowe (later Sir Edward), also a diplomat, was commercial attaché at the British Embassy. Crowe was educated at Stowe School.

Education 
Crowe earned a first-class degree in modern history from Oriel College, Oxford.

Career 
Crowe joined the Diplomatic Service and served as in Peking 1936–38 and at Shanghai 1938–40. After postings in Washington, D.C., Paris and Tel Aviv he served again in Peking (Beijing) 1950–53. Chinese 'volunteers' were fighting the Korean War and, although Britain had recognised the People's Republic of China, the communists harassed British diplomats. Crowe's brother-in-law, Antonio Riva, was executed in August 1951 on a charge of conspiring to murder chairman Mao Zedong.

Crowe was appointed as prospective chargé d'affaires in Cairo in 1957. Diplomatic relations had ceased during the Suez crisis and Crowe was unable to proceed to Cairo until 1959. His task was to overcome Egyptian suspicion and the after-effects of the Suez war so as to restore normal relations. He succeeded, and ambassadors were exchanged in 1961.

Universally liked and respected by all with whom he came in contact, he skilfully addressed the problems ... A man of less genuine modesty would have made more of what had been a major diplomatic triumph.
— Obituary, The Times, London, 24 July 1989, page 18

Crowe moved on to be deputy Permanent Representative to the United Nations in New York City. In 1963 he was appointed Ambassador to Saudi Arabia, the first since the Suez crisis. After a sabbatical year as supernumerary fellow of St Antony's College, Oxford 1964–65 he served as Chief of Administration, HM Diplomatic Service, 1965–68; High Commissioner to Canada 1968–1970; and Permanent Representative to the United Nations 1970–1973.

Crowe was neither an outstanding UN rhetorician nor an incisive drafter of telegrams and dispatches. His strength lay in the palpable decency of his character and the commonsensical soundness of his judgement. Humorous, patient, and considerate, he got the best out of his staff, who also enjoyed his explosions of fury at pomposity, pretentiousness and time-serving. His foreign interlocutors rapidly became friends whether they agreed or disagreed on policies. There cannot have been many senior Bntish diplomats in this century who were so widely popular and respected in so many different circles.
— Obituary, The Times, London, 24 July 1989, page 18

After retiring from the Diplomatic Service, Sir Colin Crowe was a director of Grindlays Bank 1976–84, chairman of the Council of Cheltenham Ladies College 1974–86, and chairman of the Marshall Aid Commemoration Commission 1973–85.

Personal life 
In 1938, while Crowe was stationed in Peking, Colin Crowe married Bettina Lum, nicknamed Peter, who as the daughter of American missionary Burt Francis Lum and artist Bertha Lum had lived in China since 1922. She became an author and an expert on China. They had no children.

Honours
Colin Crowe was appointed CMG in 1956, knighted KCMG in the Queen's Birthday Honours of 1963 on his appointment to Saudi Arabia, and promoted GCMG in the Queen's Birthday Honours of 1973.

Additional sources 
 
 CROWE, Sir Colin Tradescant, Who Was Who, A & C Black, 1920–2008; online ed., Oxford University Press, Dec 2007, accessed 19 July 2012
 Sir Colin Crowe (obituary), The Times, London, 24 July 1989, page 18

References 

|-

1913 births
1989 deaths
Alumni of Oriel College, Oxford
Ambassadors of the United Kingdom to Saudi Arabia
Crowe family
Fellows of St Antony's College, Oxford
Heads of the British Mission in Egypt
High Commissioners of the United Kingdom to Canada
Knights Grand Cross of the Order of St Michael and St George
Members of HM Diplomatic Service
People educated at Stowe School
Permanent Representatives of the United Kingdom to the United Nations
20th-century British diplomats